Richard Alexander Leman  (born 13 July 1959) is a former field hockey player.

He was a member of the gold medal-winning Great Britain squad in the 1988 Summer Olympics in Seoul. Four years earlier he won Bronze at the 1984 Summer Olympics in Los Angeles. He also won silver with the England squad at the 1986 Hockey World Cup in London. He Captained Great Britain and England from 1988 to 1990 ending his career with 228 caps.  In 1984 Leman was awarded UK Hockey Player of the Year.

Leman joined the Board of England Hockey in 2002 having served as a vice president for the previous year. He later became President of Great Britain Hockey in 2007 finishing his term in 2017 following the Olympic Gold medal won by the Women's team at Rio in 2016.  He was also a member of the British Olympic Association Executive Board from 2005 to 2016.  In 2017 Leman was appointed as a Non Executive director of British Ski and Snowboard and was nominated as the representative of the BOA on the British Olympic Foundation Charity Board.

He has also been involved in the running of East Grinstead Sports Club since 1988.  He set up the East Grinstead Sports Club Charity in 2003 and was chairman of the board until 2010.  He remains an active Trustee of the club.

Leman was born in East Grinstead, West Sussex. Between 1973 and 1977, he was educated at Gresham's School, Holt, where he played in the school's 1st XI hockey team and Captained the 1st XI cricket team and had England Schoolboy trials for both sports.  He has played all his club hockey for East Grinstead Hockey Club.

In his business career, he has founded several businesses in the recruitment sector and his first company, Olympian Consultancy, was listed as 8th in the Sunday Times Fast Track 100 companies for 1999. In the same year, Leman won the Durlacher Executive of the Year Award, as well as runner-up in the Sussex Businessman of the Year Award.  He is currently Chairman of Gold Group Recruitment, a technology and engineering recruitment firm working with companies across the globe.  In addition he is Chairman of Clearwater People Solutions and Non Exec Chairman of SLC, a sports and leisure consultancy.

He was appointed an OBE in the Queen's Birthday Honours list in 2018.

References

External links
 
 

1959 births
Living people
People educated at Gresham's School
English male field hockey players
English Olympic medallists
Olympic field hockey players of Great Britain
British male field hockey players
Olympic gold medallists for Great Britain
Olympic bronze medallists for Great Britain
Field hockey players at the 1984 Summer Olympics
Field hockey players at the 1988 Summer Olympics
People from East Grinstead
Olympic medalists in field hockey
Medalists at the 1988 Summer Olympics
Medalists at the 1984 Summer Olympics
East Grinstead Hockey Club players
1990 Men's Hockey World Cup players